EverGreene Architectural Arts (EverGreene), based in New York City, is a specialty contractor and design studio working with commercial, government, institutional, sacred and theater clients in the areas of interior restoration, conservation, decoration and new design. Established in 1978, EverGreene is a company of artists, conservators, craftsmen and designers who work throughout the United States and several sites abroad.

The company operates as both an art studio and a contractor combining art, science and technology as designers and craftsmen work side-by-side.

History 
In 1976, with the advent of the Historic Preservation tax Incentives, interest in historic preservation grew in the United States. EverGreene, originally started as a firm that almost exclusively focused on decorative painting and murals, expanded in size and service offerings to assist clients and owners of historic structures including: courthouses, state capitols, churches, synagogues, theaters and commercial buildings. To execute large scale projects, EverGreene will often partner with architecture firms during the design and planning phases and with general contractors as a specialty contractor.

Projects

Civic and institutional 
Essex County Courthouse, mural restoration (2003). Newark, NJ.
Colorado State Capitol, restoration, gilding. Denver, CO
Library of Congress, restoration, decorative paint, ornamental plaster. Washington, DC
Utah State Capitol, decorative paint, plaster restoration. Salt Lake City, UT
Thurgood Marshall United States Courthouse, restoration, decorative paint, ornamental plaster. New York, NY
Clara Barton Missing Soldier's Office, conservation, restoration, wallpaper re-creation. Washington, DC
Harlem Hospital Murals, mural removal, restoration and reinstallation. New York, NY 
Illinois State Capitol, mural restoration, ornamental plaster, decorative paint, gilding (2013). Springfield, IL.
University of Tennessee, restoration of the Greenwood Mural. Knoxville, TN

Commercial 
30 Rockefeller Plaza, mural conservation, restoration. New York, NY
Chrysler Building, mural conservation, restoration. New York, NY
Plaza Hotel, ornamental plaster, decorative paint, gilding, wood refinishing. New York, NY
The Sherry Netherland, mural conservation and restoration. New York, NY
Verizon Building, mural restoration, plaster restoration. New York, NY

Sacred 
Christ the Light Cathedral, Venetian plaster, decorative finishes. Oakland, CA
Eldridge Street Synagogue, conservation, restoration, decorative paint. New York, NY
Grace Church, conservation, stenciling, finishes restoration. Brooklyn, NY
Blessed Sacrament Cathedral, artistic design, ornamental plaster design, mural design. Greensburg, PA
Cathedral of the Immaculate Conception, mural restoration, new mural design, ornamental plaster. Wichita, KS
St. Joseph's Co-Cathedral, mural conservation and new design, ornamental plaster, scagliola, decorative paint. Brooklyn, NY

Theaters 
Paramount Theatre, historic finishes restoration, decorative paint, mural stenciling. Boston, MA
Kings Theatre, conservation, ornamental plaster, decorative paint, stone/wood/metal refinishing. Brooklyn, NY
Fox Theater, conservation, gilding, decorative paint, ornamental plaster. Oakland, CA
Richard Rodgers Theatre, decorative paint, ornamental plaster, digital wallpaper. New York, NY

Awards

Commercial 
Empire State Building, mural conservation and restoration. New York, NY

Sacred 
Basilica of the National Shrine of the Assumption of the Blessed Virgin Mary, decorative paint, ornamental plaster, gilding, exterior stucco restoration. Baltimore, MD
Church of St. Francis Xavier, ornamental plaster, mural restoration, decorative paint. New York, NY

Theaters 
Lerner Theatre, historic finish replication, decorative paint. Elkhart, IN
Bob Hope Theatre, conservation and restoration. Stockton, CA

References

External links 
 EverGreene Architectural Arts
 W.W. Norton Company, Edwin Blashfield by Mina Rieur Weiner with introduction by Jeff Greene http://books.wwnorton.com/books/978-0-393-73281-8/

Design companies of the United States
Conservation and restoration organizations
Companies based in New York City
Design companies established in 1978
1978 establishments in New York (state)